The 1985 San Diego Padres season was the 17th season in franchise history. Led by manager Dick Williams, the Padres were unable to defend their National League championship.

Offseason
 December 3, 1984: Doug Gwosdz was drafted from the Padres by the San Francisco Giants in the 1984 rule 5 draft.
 January 3, 1985: Jerry Royster was signed as a free agent by the Padres.
 February 7, 1985: Fritzie Connally was traded by the Padres to the Baltimore Orioles for Vic Rodriguez.
 February 13, 1985: Greg Harris was purchased from the Padres by the Texas Rangers.
 February 16, 1985: Roberto Alomar was signed by the Padres as an amateur free agent.

Regular season
 Steve Garvey's errorless games streak ended on April 14, 1985. The streak started on June 26, 1983.
 LaMarr Hoyt tied a club record by winning 11 straight decisions.

Opening Day starters
Steve Garvey
Tony Gwynn
Terry Kennedy
Carmelo Martínez
Kevin McReynolds
Jerry Royster
Eric Show
Garry Templeton
Alan Wiggins

Season standings

Record vs. opponents

Notable transactions
 April 6, 1985: Mitch Williams was traded by the Padres to the Texas Rangers for Randy Asadoor.

Roster

Player stats

Batting

Starters by position
Note: Pos = Position; G = Games played; AB = At bats; H = Hits; Avg. = Batting average; HR = Home runs; RBI = Runs batted in

Other batters
Note: G = Games played; AB = At bats; H = Hits; Avg. = Batting average; HR = Home runs; RBI = Runs batted in

Pitching

Starting pitchers
Note: G = Games pitched; IP = Innings pitched; W = Wins; L = Losses; ERA = Earned run average; SO = Strikeouts

Other pitchers
Note: G = Games pitched; IP = Innings pitched; W = Wins; L = Losses; ERA = Earned run average; SO = Strikeouts

Relief pitchers
Note; G = Games pitched; W = Wins; L = Losses; SV = Saves; ERA = Earned run average; SO = Strikeouts

Award winners
Garry Templeton, tied Major League record with four Intentional Walks in a game on July 5, 1985
1985 Major League Baseball All-Star Game
 LaMarr Hoyt, pitcher, reserve
 Hoyt was the Winning Pitcher for the National League
 Garry Templeton, shortstop, reserve
 LaMarr Hoyt, All-Star Game Most Valuable Player

Farm system

References

External links
 1985 San Diego Padres at Baseball Reference
 1985 San Diego Padres at Baseball Almanac

San Diego Padres seasons
San Diego Padres season
San Diego Padres